Silicone quaternary amine is a chemical antimicrobial agent used in some odor-repellent socks, including Burlington Bioguard Socks.

External links 
 Straight Dope: How do odor-eating socks work?

Antimicrobials
Polymers